Chen Haiwei (born 30 December 1994) is a Chinese competitive foil fencer. He has won three medals (one gold, one silver, one bronze) at the Asian Fencing Championships, two medals (one silver, one bronze) at the Asian Games, and two medals (one silver, one bronze) at the World Fencing Championships.

Career
A restless child, Chen enjoyed many different sports. He took up fencing at age 13 after his parents had him try different options for the summer holidays. He created a surprise in the 2014 Junior World Championships at Plovdiv by defeating in the semi-final Alexander Massialas of the United States, then Alexander Choupenitch of the Czech Republic. The same year Chen won the silver medal at the 2014 Asian Fencing Championships in Suwon. In the World Championships at Kazan he was defeated in the second round by Aleksey Cheremisinov, who eventually won the gold medal. In the team event, No.5 seed China defeated Egypt, the United States and Italy to meet France in the final. They were overcome 25-45 and came away with the silver medal.

References

1994 births
Living people
Chinese male foil fencers
Sportspeople from Quanzhou
Asian Games medalists in fencing
Fencers at the 2014 Asian Games
Asian Games silver medalists for China
Asian Games bronze medalists for China
Olympic fencers of China
Fencers at the 2016 Summer Olympics
Medalists at the 2014 Asian Games
Fencers from Fujian
Left-handed fencers
21st-century Chinese people